Ki-baik Lee (1924–2004) was a leading South Korean historian.  He was born in Jeongju-gun, in North Pyeongan province in what is today North Korea.  He graduated from the Osan School in 1941, attending Waseda University in Tokyo but ultimately graduating from Seoul National University in 1947.

Lee was Professor of History, at Sogang University, Seoul. His most noted work was the New History of Korea (Kuksa Sillon, to echo Shin Chaeho's 1908 Doksa Sillon), first published in 1967 and revised thereafter. New History of Korea was published in English in translation by Edward W. Wagner.

Publications
 한국사신론(韓國史新論) 
 A New History of Korea (English translation)

See also
History of Korea
List of Koreans

References

South Korean historians
1924 births
2004 deaths
Historians of Korea
People from North Pyongan
Seoul National University alumni
Waseda University alumni
Academic staff of Sogang University
20th-century historians
Members of the National Academy of Sciences of the Republic of Korea